Moisés Costa Ferreira (born 22 October 1990, in Setúbal), known simply as Moisés, is a Portuguese professional footballer who plays for Oriental Dragon FC as a forward.

External links

Moisés at ZeroZero

1990 births
Living people
Sportspeople from Setúbal
Portuguese footballers
Association football forwards
Primeira Liga players
Segunda Divisão players
C.D. Pinhalnovense players
Vitória F.C. players
Sertanense F.C. players
Casa Pia A.C. players
C.D. Cova da Piedade players
S.C.U. Torreense players
G.D. Fabril players
F.C. Barreirense players